With Fire and Sword (Vohnem i Mechem) is a 1999 Polish historical drama film directed by Jerzy Hoffman. The film is based on the novel With Fire and Sword, the first part in The Trilogy of Henryk Sienkiewicz.
At the time of its filming it was the most expensive Polish film ever made.

Plot
The story is set in Ukrainian lands of the Crown of the Kingdom of Poland during the Khmelnytsky Uprising of the mid-17th century. A Polish noble, Skrzetuski, and a Cossack otaman Bohun, both fall in love with the same woman, Helena. Their rivalry unfolds against the backdrop of a Cossack uprising led by Bohdan Khmelnytsky, aimed at reclaiming control of the land from the hands of the Polish nobles. Historic events form a framework for an action and character driven plot, and fictional characters mingle with historic ones. The movie, as the book, culminates with the savage siege of Zbarazh.

Cast
 Izabella Scorupco as Helena Kurcewiczówna
 Michał Żebrowski as Jan Skrzetuski
 Aleksandr Domogarov as Jurko Bohun
 Krzysztof Kowalewski as Jan Onufry Zagłoba
 Bohdan Stupka as Bohdan Khmelnytsky
 Andrzej Seweryn as Jeremi Wiśniowiecki
 Zbigniew Zamachowski as Michał Wołodyjowski
 Wiktor Zborowski as Longinus Podbipięta
 Daniel Olbrychski as Toğay bey (Tuhaj Bej)
 Marek Kondrat as John II Casimir
 Wojciech Malajkat as Rzędzian
 Ewa Wiśniewska as Kurcewiczowa
 Ruslana Pysanka as Horpyna
 Gustaw Holoubek as Adam Kisiel
 Andrzej Kopiczyński as Zaćwilichowski
 Maciej Kozłowski as Maxym Kryvonis
 Adam Ferency as İslâm III Giray
 Gustaw Lutkiewicz as Yakiv Barabash
 Dmytro Myrhorodsky as Koshovy otaman
 Jerzy Bończak as Daniel Czapliński
 Krzysztof Gosztyla as Jerzy Ossoliński
 Szymon Kobylinski as Mikołaj Ostroróg
 Andrzej Szczytko as Otaman

Critical reception
The movie has been criticized for introducing some factual inaccuracies not found in the source material. One of the least accurate sections of the film is Hoffman's presentation of the first battle between the Poles and the Cossacks, the Battle of Zhovti Vody. The movie suggests that the Poles were quickly routed by Cossacks and the Polish elite cavalry (husaria) showed needless bravado in the face of unfavorable weather conditions. In reality, the Poles not only were greatly outnumbered, especially after they had been deserted by all of the Cossacks, who had switched sides and joined Bohdan Khmelnytsky, but also had a young commander, Stefan Potocki, who was only 24 years old. Even so, the battle was eventually lost by the Poles but lasted for nearly three weeks.

The original book is often deemed to be nationalistic and Ukrainophobic, especially in Ukraine. The movie, on the other hand, has been praised for its depiction of Ukraine and Ukrainians as "vivid rather than monochromatic; they are multi-dimensional, eliciting more than one feeling of, say, fascination or dislike". However, some Polish reviewers felt that the movie emphasized the Cossacks' successes and positive traits but diminished those of the Poles in the spirit of political correctness.

The director was aware of the controversies and the criticism. He was quoted as saying,
"Sienkiewicz's book is still considered anti-Ukrainian by some Ukrainians. I understand that problem, but when I was in Kiev at a conference of Ukrainian intellectuals... many people with whom I spoke had read the novel closely and they quoted whole passages where Sienkiewicz criticized the Polish nobles as strongly as the Cossacks. For both sides it was clear that the result of this tragic conflict was the eventual demise of both the Commonwealth and the Sich. I am well aware that the film may agitate those in Ukraine who blame everything on the Poles, and in Poland those who blame all that was bad on the Ukrainians. My film will certainly not convince any radicals.... My film finishes with the final words of Sienkiewicz's novel: 'Hatred poisoned the hearts of two brother nations'".

Political background

Although the original novel is the first part of the Trilogy, the film was the last part of Hoffman's version of the trilogy to be made, following The Deluge, which was filmed in 1974, and Colonel Wolodyjowski, which was filmed in 1969. This might have been due to political tension between Polish People's Republic and Ukrainian SSR, as filming a novel taking up a politically loaded subject of Polish-Ukrainian relations (another stalled film project was Taras Bulba by Nikolai Gogol) was deemed undesired by the Soviet Union.

Box office
The film turned out to be a box office success grossing PLN 105,089,363 ($26,366,071) against a budget of PLN 24,000,000 ($8,000,000).

See also
 The Deluge
 Colonel Wolodyjowski

References

External links

1999 films
1990s historical films
Epic films based on actual events
Polish historical films
1990s Polish-language films
Ukrainian-language films
1990s Turkish-language films
Films based on works by Henryk Sienkiewicz
Films about religious violence
Films about Orthodoxy
Films set in the 1640s
Films set in the 1650s
Films set in Ukraine
Films set in Poland
Films directed by Jerzy Hoffman
Historical epic films
Polish adventure films
Polish drama films
1990s adventure drama films
1999 drama films
War epic films
1999 multilingual films
Polish multilingual films
Polish epic films